The Midland line is a suburban rail service on the Transperth network in Perth, Western Australia. It runs on the Eastern Railway through Perth's eastern suburbs and connects Midland with Perth. Travelling from Midland, the trains terminate at Fremantle on the Fremantle line.

History
The section of the Eastern Railway between Fremantle, Perth and Guildford was the first suburban railway line in Perth, opening on 1 March 1881.

The line was extended from Guildford to Chidlow's Well, opening in March 1884.
Throughout the 1880s, the Eastern Railway line was extended beyond Guildford and Midland Junction along its first route to Chidlow and Northam. The second route varied after Bellevue proceeding to Chidlow via the Swan View Tunnel, Parkerville and Stoneville.

The third route saw the removal of the Bellevue Railway station in its construction, with the new Midland railway terminus replacing the older Midland Junction railway station.
An anomaly of the Midland line timetables in the 1950s and 1960s was that Bellevue was nominally the terminus of the line until 1962. Koongamia, which was a new station prior to Greenmount on the original first route, was the terminus from 1962 to 1966.

In 1966, the stations on the first two Eastern Railway routes as well as the old Midland Junction railway station were closed and the new Midland was constructed  to the west and became the new terminus.

Generally, changes from the 1970s saw a significant number of stations on the line moved or turned into island platform stations (to be compatible with the double track, dual-gauge track configuration between East Perth and Midland).

On 24 July 2004, Bassendean became the first station to be upgraded under the "Building Better Stations" project.

In the earlier decades of the 21st century, a significant number of rail-crossing accidents between motor vehicles and trains occurred.  Unattended crossings were provided with boom gates, flashing lights and bells to counter inattention or risk taking from drivers.  Also, crossings were reduced, and in a number of locations, bridges were constructed.

Airport railway connection
In December 2013, the Government of Western Australia announced its intention to construct a railway line branching off the Midland line north of Bayswater to Forrestfield via Perth Airport. Construction of the Forrestfield–Airport Link commenced in November 2016 and was scheduled to open in 2021. However, after delays, it opened on 9 October 2022.

Morley–Ellenbrook line
The future Morley–Ellenbrook line is also due to be built as a branch from the Midland line northward after Bayswater station, due for completion in 2024.

Description
During hot weather, the tracks can distort. As a result, train speeds are reduced by approximately  when the air temperature is above , and by an additional  when the air temperature is above .

The Transperth network currently uses fixed block signalling and automatic train protection, which stops trains that pass a red signal and slows trains that drive too fast. These systems will be replaced by an automatic train control system, likely a communications-based train control system. The new systems are planned to be in place on the Midland line by June 2027.

Route

Stations
Since 21 July 2019, all regular services stop at all stations on this line.

Service

Patronage
Below is the annual patronage of Midland line from 2010 to 2020 financial year. Figures are provided as total boardings, which includes all fare-paying boardings and free travel on stations within the free transit zones as well as transfers between stations. The figures for rail replacement and special events services are not included in the total.

See also

Current information
Transperth
Transperth Train Operations
List of Transperth railway stations

Historical information
Midland Railway of Western Australia

References

Further reading
 Watson, Lindsay The Railway History of Midland Junction: Commemorating The Centenary of Midland Junction, 1895-1995 Swan View, W.A: L & S Drafting in association with the Shire of Swan and the Western Australian Light Railway Preservation Association, 1995

 
Railway lines in Perth, Western Australia
Midland, Western Australia
Eastern Railway (Western Australia)
Railway lines opened in 1881
1881 establishments in Australia